Adolf Gruber (15 May 1920 – 7 January 1994) was an Austrian long-distance runner. He competed in the marathon at the 1952, 1956 and the 1960 Summer Olympics.  His personal best time in this event was 2:23:30.

References

External links
 

1920 births
1994 deaths
Athletes (track and field) at the 1952 Summer Olympics
Athletes (track and field) at the 1956 Summer Olympics
Athletes (track and field) at the 1960 Summer Olympics
Austrian male long-distance runners
Austrian male marathon runners
Olympic athletes of Austria
Athletes from Vienna